Henry Baxter (September 8, 1821 – December 30, 1873) was a general in the Union Army during the American Civil War. At the Battle of Gettysburg, his brigade resisted a Confederate assault from parts of Maj. Gen. Robert E. Rodes's division, slaughtering hundreds in a surprise attack on BG Alfred Iverson's brigade, and held the north flank of the Union position for much of the day before retiring due to lack of ammunition. He was wounded four times during the war. He later served as President Grant's Minister to Honduras.

Early life and career
Baxter was born in Sidney Plains, Delaware County, New York. His grandfathers had both served in the American Revolutionary War. In 1831, he and his father moved to Jonesville, Michigan. In 1849, he traveled to California with a company of thirty men in search of gold, returning in 1852 to Jonesville to become a miller. He commanded a military unit he organized known as the Jonesville Light Guards.

Civil War

Early assignments
He was wounded severely in the abdomen during the Seven Days Battles. During the Battle of Antietam, as lieutenant colonel of his regiment, he was wounded again in the right leg as his regiment was decimated along with the rest of Maj. Gen. John Sedgwick's division during an ambush. He left for Michigan to recuperate, and was promoted to command of the regiment prior to the Battle of Fredericksburg. His regiment was selected to make an amphibious assault to drive Confederate sharpshooters out of the town, and they were successful, although Baxter was again wounded, this time in the left shoulder. When he returned to duty, he was appointed brigadier general on March 12, 1863.

Gettysburg
At the Battle of Gettysburg, Baxter's I Corps brigade arrived around noon just as Confederate Maj. Gen. Robert Rodes's 8,000 man division began to appear on Oak Hill. Baxter's brigade advanced far beyond the nearest Federal brigade on the right flank of the line and deployed in a V shaped formation along the Mummasburg Road. Rodes's division attacked piecemeal, and scores of Colonel Edward A. O'Neal's men were mowed down. Shortly afterward, a Confederate brigade under BG Alfred Iverson advanced without skirmishers and moved past Baxter's men, who were hidden behind a stone wall. Suddenly, the men of Baxter's brigade rose up and delivered a lethal fire into the North Carolinians. In one of the most one-sided exchanges during the war, Baxter's surprise attack killed, wounded and captured 758 of 1300 men in Confederate Iverson's brigade and eliminated it as an effective fighting force in under ten minutes. Running low on ammunition, Baxter's men withdrew to the north end of Cemetery Ridge, having lost all of the officers on Baxter's staff and close to half the brigade in defense of the I Corps right flank. He received glowing praise from his division commander, Maj. Gen. John C. Robinson, and a subordinate wrote that, "I wish to say one word outside of my regiment in regard to Generals Baxter and Robinson. They were on every part of the field, encouraging and stimulating the men by their presence and bravery."

1864–1865
Baxter retained command of his brigade during the reorganization of the Army of the Potomac in March 1864, a sign that he held the confidence of his superiors. His brigade was assigned to the 2nd Division, V Corps, under Maj. Gen. Robinson. At the Battle of the Wilderness, he was shot in the left leg, the bullet also killing his horse. After recuperating, he led a brigade in the 3rd Division, V Corps, during later stages of the siege of Richmond and Petersburg. He was mustered out of the volunteers on August 24, 1865. On May 31, 1866, President Andrew Johnson nominated Baxter for the award of the brevet grade of major general to rank from April 1, 1865 and the U.S. Senate confirmed the award on July 23, 1866.

Postbellum career
Baxter served as Register of Deeds for the State of Michigan and was then appointed by President Grant as Minister to Honduras in 1869. He returned home in 1872 and became active in the lumber business before dying from pneumonia in 1873. He died in Jonesville and is buried in Jonesville Cemetery.

McFarland Publishing published a biography entitled "General Henry Baxter, 7th Michigan Volunteer Infantry: A Biography" in 2016.

See also

List of American Civil War generals (Union)

Notes

References
 Eicher, John H., and David J. Eicher. Civil War High Commands. Stanford, CA: Stanford University Press, 2001. .
 Lash, Gary G. "Brig. Gen. Henry Baxter’s Brigade at Gettysburg, July 1." Gettysburg Magazine 10 (January 1994): 6-27.
 Tagg, Larry. The Generals of Gettysburg. Campbell, CA: Savas Publishing, 1998. .
 Warner, Ezra J. Generals in Blue: Lives of the Union Commanders. Baton Rouge: Louisiana State University Press, 1964. .

Further reading
 Martin, David G. Gettysburg July 1. rev. ed. Conshohocken, PA: Combined Publishing, 1996. .
 Pfanz, Harry W. Gettysburg – The First Day. Chapel Hill: University of North Carolina Press, 2001. .
 Martin, Jay C. "General Henry Baxter, 7th Michigan Volunteer Infantry: A Biography." McFarland Publishing, 2016.

External links
, Official Records of the American Civil War

Henry Baxter letters and reports, MSS 894 at L. Tom Perry Special Collections, Brigham Young University

1821 births
1873 deaths
Union Army generals
People of Michigan in the American Civil War
Ambassadors of the United States to Honduras
People from Sidney, New York
People from Jonesville, Michigan